Veronica Ormachea Gutierrez (born 30 July 1956) is a Bolivian writer and journalist and a member of the Bolivian Academy of Royal Spanish Academy.

Biography
Ormachea was born in New York City on July 30, 1956. She was born there because of the exile of her parents in the wake of the 1952 revolution. She is the daughter of industrialist Víctor Ormachea Zalles and Martha Gutiérrez. She married Ramiro Montes Sáenz and has two children: Verónica and Ramiro Montes Ormachea.

Ormachea graduated in Interdisciplinary Studies in Communications, Legal Institutions, Economics and Government at the American University in Washington, D.C. 1980. She obtained the Higher Diploma of French Language and Civilization at the Sorbonne in 1983. She graduated from the Master's in Political Science, Mention in Bolivian Studies at the University of San Simón de Cochabamba (CESU CEBEM) in 1997.  She participated in the Executive Program for Development Leaders of the Harvard Kennedy School of Government in 1999. She worked as a diplomat in the Ministry of Foreign Affairs of Bolivia. She had children and she dedicated herself to writing. She received the Franz Tamayo Prize for Literary Creation from the Association of Journalists of La Paz (APLZ) in 2001.

From that year, Ormachea began as a columnist in the newspaper La Razón de Bolivia until 2010, when the independent newspaper Siete de Bolivia was founded where she writes to this day. The Ministry of Culture and Tourism of Bolivia awarded her the diploma "In recognition of his career and literary production as a valuable contribution to artistic and cultural development in the country" in 2009. She also writes in digital newspapers such as SudamericaHoy and Mundiario. She was a jurist of the Cervantes Prize in 2015. She is a member of PEN International.

Works 
Entierro sin muerte - El secuestro de Doria Media por el MRTA, La Paz Crónica.  (1998)
Buried Alive. The kidnapping of Doria Medina by the MRTA. Translation Leif Yourston. Non-fiction.  (2012)
Los ingenuos La Paz, Alfaguara, Novela.  (2007)
Los ingenuos. USA, Ed. La Pereza. Spanish Edition, Novela Histórica.  (2020)
Los infames La Paz, Ed. Gisbert.  (2016)
Los infames Madrid, Ed. Lord Byron, Novela.  (2016)
El Che, Miradas personales Participan otros autores. Ed.Plural. Ensayo.  (2017)
Hochschild´s Passports. USA. Lazy Publisher. Historical novel. Translation Katie Fry.  (2019)

Awards
Reconocimiento: Al compromiso y vocacion de servicio en beneficio a la comunidad Rotary Club, La Paz, Bolivia, marzo 2021.

References 

1956 births
Living people
20th-century Bolivian women writers
21st-century Bolivian women writers
Bolivian women journalists